The 1972–73 Washington Huskies men's basketball team represented the University of Washington for the 1972–73 NCAA college basketball season. Led by second-year head coach Marv Harshman, the Huskies were members of the Pacific-8 Conference and played their home games on campus at Hec Edmundson Pavilion in Seattle, Washington.

References

External links
Sports Reference – Washington Huskies: 1972–73 basketball season

Washington Huskies men's basketball seasons
Washington Huskies
Washington
Washington